Jason Staczek (born December 4, 1965) is an American composer, record producer and keyboardist.

Life and career
Staczek was born in Washington, D.C., attended high school in Miami and studied physics at the University of Michigan. He played the Hammond organ in Seattle bands and sessions beginning in the 1990s. From 2002 to 2008 Staczek co-owned Chroma Sound, a music and film post-production studio and record label in Seattle. Clients of Chroma Sound included Presidents of the United States of America and Robyn Hitchcock. In 2003 Staczek was hired as staff composer for The Film Company, a Seattle film production studio, through which he met and developed a working relationship with Canadian director Guy Maddin.

Staczek has composed music for the soundtracks to the films Brand Upon the Brain! (2006), My Winnipeg (2008), Keyhole (2011), Jobriath A.D. (2012), The Roper (2013) and Song of the New Earth (2014). Brand Upon the Brain! premiered at the 2006 Toronto International Film Festival, where the silent film was accompanied by a live orchestra conducted by Staczek, narrated by Louis Negin, with sound provided by three live Foley artists and a castrato-style singer. Staczek went on to conduct orchestras accompanying the film's live performances in Berlin, Buenos Aires, New York, Mexico City, San Francisco and Los Angeles.

Staczek was named a Sundance Composer Lab Fellow in 2012. His concert work for cimbalom and orchestra premiered at Benaroya Hall in Seattle in March 2013. The piece was released on the album Celebrate World Music which won the 2014 Independent Music Awards Vox Pop Award for Best Contemporary Classical Album.

Partial filmography

TV Series

Partial Discography

Further reading 
 Newfangled Silent Movie With a Bit of Old Barnum
Not for the Faint of Heart or Lazy of Thought

References

External links 

Interview with Jason Staczek at Howlin' Wolf

1965 births
Living people
American film score composers
American television composers
University of Michigan College of Literature, Science, and the Arts alumni